Davidson County is the name of two counties in the United States:

 Davidson County, North Carolina 
 Davidson County, Tennessee